Dan Moody is an outdoor sculpture depicting the politician of the same name by Lucas Adams, installed outside the Williamson County Courthouse in Georgetown, Texas, United States. The statue was installed on October 14, 2016.

See also

 2016 in art

References

2016 establishments in Texas
2016 sculptures
Bronze sculptures in Texas
Monuments and memorials in Texas
Outdoor sculptures in Texas
Sculptures of men in Texas
Statues in Texas
Georgetown, Texas